Clavus clara is a species of sea snail, a marine gastropod mollusk in the family Drilliidae.

Description
The shell is smooth, plicately ribbed and round shouldered. The color of the shell is purple brown and the upper part of the whorls is whitish. The length of the shell is 15 mm.

Distribution
This species is found in the demersal zone of tropical waters in the Indo-Pacific.

References

 Reeve. Proc. Zool. Soc. of London, 1845

External links

clara
Gastropods described in 1845